The Silvercraft SH-4 is an Italian three-seater light helicopter designed and built by Silvercraft SpA.

Design and production
The Silvercraft SH-4 was the first Italian designed helicopter to gain Italian and FAA certification. The prototype was first flown in October 1963 with development assisted with both financial and technical help from SIAI-Marchetti. The helicopter was a conventional design with two-blade main rotor and tail rotor, a skid landing gear and a high-set tubular corrugated tailboom. It is powered by either a 200 hp (149 kW) or 235 hp (175 kW) Franklin 6A-350 engines which have been flat-rated to 170 hp (127 kW). Some SH-4s were equipped with Lycoming LHIO-360-C1A engines of 205 hp (153 kW).

Two aircraft were evaluated by the Italian Air Force.

An upgraded development, the SH-200 was developed from the SH-4 but was only flown as a prototype.

Operators

Italian Air Force  operated one Silvercraft SH-4 for evaluation test

Variants
SH-4
Standard production variant.
SH-4A
Agricultural variant.
SH-4L
Lycoming powered variant
SH-4T
Turbine powered variant

Specifications (SH-4)

References

 
 

1960s Italian civil utility aircraft
1960s Italian helicopters
Aircraft first flown in 1963